Kennedy Otieno Obuya (born 11 March 1972), also known as Kennedy Otieno, is a former Kenyan international cricketer. A right-handed batsman and wicketkeeper, Otieno is the brother of fellow internationals Collins and David Obuya.

Domestic career
In 2008, Otieno was selected as captain of The Southern Stars, a team in Kenya's recently launched domestic cricket competition the Sahara Elite League. His most recent big scores came when he made 93 in The Southern Stars only win in the One day edition of the Sahara Elite league. as well as two centuries in the 2-day league earning him a recall to the national squad.

International career
Kennedy made his ODI debut in 1996, but had his finest innings in 1997, a 144 against Bangladesh, in a then-world-record 225 partnership with Dipak Chudasama. He was one of the key players during the 2003 Cricket World Cup, where he played in every game, and he played 71 of Kenya's 74 ODIs between the 1996 World Cup and the 2005–06 tour of Bangladesh (only missing three home matches against West Indies in 2001). However, he was dropped for the first 2006 Intercontinental Cup first class game against the Netherlands, and vowed to quit international cricket as a result.

References

External links
 

1972 births
Living people
Cricketers from Nairobi
Kenyan cricketers
Kenya One Day International cricketers
Kenya Twenty20 International cricketers
Southern Stars cricketers
Cricketers at the 1996 Cricket World Cup
Cricketers at the 1998 Commonwealth Games
Cricketers at the 1999 Cricket World Cup
Cricketers at the 2003 Cricket World Cup
Commonwealth Games competitors for Kenya
Wicket-keepers